Panax ginseng, ginseng, also known as Asian ginseng, Chinese ginseng, Japanese gingseng or Korean ginseng, is a species of plant whose root is the original source of ginseng. It is a perennial plant that grows in the mountains of East Asia.

Names 

Description
Panax ginseng is a herbaceous perennial growing from  30 to 60 cm tall. Plants have a spindle or cylinder-shaped taproot usually with 1 or 2 main branches. Plants produce 3 to 6 leaves that are palmately compound with each leaf having 3 to 5 leaflets. The margins of the leaflets are densely serrulate. The flowers are born in a solitary inflorescence that is a terminal umbel with 30 to 50 flowers. The peduncles of the flowers are 15 to 30 cm long. The flower ovary is 2-carpellate and each carpel has two distinct styles.  Mature fruits are 4-5 x 6-7 millimeters in size, red in color, and round with flattened ends. The white seeds are kidney-shaped. The (2n) diploid chromosome count is 48.

Distribution 
Panax ginseng is native to mountainous regions of Russian Far East (Outer Manchuria), Northeast China, and the Korean Peninsula. It is a protected plant in Russia and China, and most commercial ginseng is now sourced from plants cultivated in China, Korea and Russia. It is also cultivated in some areas of Japan. The plant is a slow-growing perennial and the roots are usually harvested when the plants are five or six years old.

Cultivation 
Panax ginseng is one of the most commonly cultivated ginseng species, along with P. notoginseng (found naturally in China) and P. quinquefolius.

Research
There is no high-quality evidence for ginseng having a health effect. Ginseng phytochemicals called ginsenosides are under preliminary research for their potential to affect fatigue in people with multiple sclerosis. Panax ginseng is generally considered safe for adults when used for less than six months, but may be unsafe to use for longer than six months.

Folk medicine 
Ginseng is used as an herb in folk medicine. It is consumed due to belief that it may improve memory and cognition in otherwise healthy adults, and that it may improve sexual function in adults with erectile dysfunction.

See also 

 American ginseng

References 

Flora of China
Korean vegetables
ginseng
Plants described in 1842